() is a city in Japan. It is the largest city north of Tokyo and the largest city on Hokkaido, the northernmost main island of the country. It ranks as the fifth most populous city in Japan. It is the capital city of Hokkaido Prefecture and Ishikari Subprefecture. Sapporo lies in the southwest of Hokkaido, within the alluvial fan of the Toyohira River, which is a tributary stream of the Ishikari. It is considered the cultural, economic, and political center of Hokkaido.

As with most of Hokkaido, the Sapporo area was settled by the indigenous Ainu people, beginning over 15,000 years ago. Starting in the late 19th century, Sapporo saw increasing settlement by Yamato migrants. Sapporo hosted the 1972 Winter Olympics, the first Winter Olympics ever held in Asia, and the second Olympic games held in Japan after the 1964 Summer Olympics. Sapporo is currently bidding for the 2030 Winter Olympics. The Sapporo Dome hosted three games during the 2002 FIFA World Cup and two games during the 2019 Rugby World Cup. Additionally, Sapporo has hosted the Asian Winter Games three times, in 1986, 1990, and 2017 and the 1991 Winter Universiade.

The annual Sapporo Snow Festival draws more than 2 million tourists from abroad. Other notable sites include the Sapporo Beer Museum, which is the only beer museum in Japan, and the Sapporo TV Tower located in Odori Park. It is home to Hokkaido University, just north of Sapporo Station. The city is served by Okadama Airport and New Chitose Airport in nearby Chitose.

Etymology 
Sapporo's name was taken from Ainuic sat poro pet, which can be translated as the "dry, great river", a reference to the Toyohira River.

History

Early history 
Before its establishment, the area occupied by Sapporo (known as the Ishikari Plain) was home to a number of indigenous Ainu settlements. In 1866, at the end of the Edo period, construction began on a canal through the area, encouraging a number of early settlers to establish Sapporo village.  In 1868, the officially recognized year celebrated as the "birth" of Sapporo, the new Meiji government concluded that the existing administrative center of Hokkaido, which at the time was the port of Hakodate, was in an unsuitable location for defense and further development of the island. As a result, it was determined that a new capital on the Ishikari Plain should be established. The plain itself provided an unusually large expanse of flat, well-drained land which is relatively uncommon in the otherwise mountainous geography of Hokkaido.

During 1870–1871, Kuroda Kiyotaka, vice-chairman of the Hokkaido Development Commission (Kaitaku-shi), approached the American government for assistance in developing the land. As a result, Horace Capron, Secretary of Agriculture under President Ulysses S. Grant, became an oyatoi gaikokujin and was appointed as a special advisor to the commission. Construction began around Odori Park, which still remains as a green ribbon of recreational land bisecting the central area of the city. The city closely followed a grid plan with streets at right-angles to form city blocks.  The continuing expansion of the Japanese into Hokkaido continued, mainly due to migration from the main island of Honshu immediately to the south, and the prosperity of Hokkaido and particularly its capital grew to the point that the Development Commission was deemed unnecessary and was abolished in 1882. In 1871, the Hokkaidō Shrine was built in its current location as the Sapporo Shrine.

Edwin Dun came to Sapporo to establish sheep and cattle ranches in 1876. He also demonstrated pig raising and the making of butter, cheese, ham and sausage. He was married twice, to Japanese women. He once went back to the US in 1883 but returned to Japan as a secretary of government.  William S. Clark, who was the president of the Massachusetts Agricultural College (now the University of Massachusetts Amherst), came to be the founding vice-president of the Sapporo Agricultural College (now Hokkaido University) for only eight months from 1876 to 1877. He taught academic subjects in science and lectured on the Bible as an "ethics" course, introducing Christian principles to the first entering class of the college.

In 1880, the entire area of Sapporo was renamed as "Sapporo-ku" (Sapporo Ward), and a railroad between Sapporo and Temiya, Otaru was laid. That year the Hōheikan, a hotel and reception facility for visiting officials and dignitaries, was built adjacent to the Odori Park. It was later moved to Nakajima Park where it remains today. Two years later, with the abolition of the Kaitaku-shi, Hokkaidō was divided into three prefectures: Hakodate, Sapporo, and Nemuro. The name of the urban district in Sapporo remained Sapporo-ku, while the rest of the area in Sapporo-ku was changed to Sapporo-gun. The office building of Sapporo-ku was also located in the urban district.

Sapporo, Hakodate, and Nemuro Prefectures were abolished in 1886, and Hokkaidō government office building, an American-neo-baroque-style structure with red bricks, constructed in 1888. The last squad of the Tondenhei, the soldiers pioneering Hokkaido, settled in the place where the area of Tonden in Kita-ku, Sapporo is currently located. Sapporo-ku administered surrounding Sapporo-gun until 1899, when the new district system was announced. After that year, Sapporo-ku was away from the control of Sapporo-gun. The "ku" (district) enforced from 1899 was an autonomy which was a little bigger than towns, and smaller than cities. In Hokkaido at that time, Hakodate-ku and Otaru-ku also existed.

20th century 
In 1907, the Tohoku Imperial University was established in Sendai Miyagi Prefecture, and Sapporo Agricultural College was controlled by the university. Parts of neighbouring villages including Sapporo Village, Naebo Village, Kami Shiroishi Village, and districts where the Tonden-hei had settled, were integrated into Sapporo-ku in 1910.

The Sapporo Streetcar was opened in 1918, and Hokkaido Imperial University was established in Sapporo-ku, as the fifth Imperial University in Japan. Another railroad operated in Sapporo, the Jōzankei Railroad, which was ultimately abolished in 1969.

In 1922, the new city system was announced by the Tokyo government, and Sapporo-ku was officially changed to Sapporo City. The Sapporo Municipal Bus System was started in 1930. In 1937, Sapporo was chosen as the site of the 1940 Winter Olympics, but due to the outbreak of the Second Sino-Japanese War, this was cancelled the next year. Maruyama Town was integrated as a part of Chūō-ku in 1940, and the Okadama Airport was constructed in 1942. During World War II, the city was bombed by American naval aircraft in July 1945.

The first Sapporo Snow Festival was held in 1950. In the same year, adjacent Shiroishi Village was integrated into Sapporo City, rendered as a part of Shiroishi-ku, and Atsubetsu-ku. In 1955, Kotoni Town, the entire Sapporo Village, and Shinoro Village were merged into Sapporo, becoming a part of the current Chūō-ku, Kita-ku, Higashi-ku, Nishi-ku, and Teine-ku. The expansion of Sapporo continued, with the merger of Toyohira Town in 1961, and Teine Town in 1967, each becoming a part of Toyohira-ku, Kiyota-ku, and Teine-ku.

The ceremony commemorating the 100th anniversary of the foundation of Sapporo and Hokkaido was held in 1968. The Sapporo Municipal Subway system was inaugurated in 1971, which made Sapporo the fourth city in Japan to have a subway system. From February 3 to 13, 1972, the 1972 Winter Olympics were held, the first Winter Olympics held in Asia. On April 1 of the same year, Sapporo was designated as one of the cities designated by government ordinance, and seven wards were established. The last public performance by the opera singer, Maria Callas, was in Sapporo at the Hokkaido Koseinenkin Kaikan on 11 November 1974. The Sapporo Municipal Subway was expanded when the Tōzai line started operation in 1976, and the Tōhō line was opened in 1988. In 1989, Atsubetsu-ku and Teine-ku were separated from Shiroishi-ku and Nishi-ku. Annual events in Sapporo were started, such as the Pacific Music Festival in 1990, and Yosakoi Sōran Festival in 1992. A professional football club, Consadole Sapporo, was established in 1996. In 1997, Kiyota-ku was separated from Toyohira-ku. In the same year, Hokkaidō Takushoku Bank, a Hokkaido-based bank with headquarters in Odori, went bankrupt.

21st century 

In 2001 the construction of the Sapporo Dome was completed, and in 2002 the Dome hosted three games during the 2002 FIFA World Cup; Germany vs Saudi Arabia, Argentina vs England and Italy vs Ecuador, all of which were in the first round. Fumio Ueda, was elected as Sapporo mayor for the first time in 2003. Sapporo became the home to a Nippon Professional Baseball team, Hokkaido Nippon-Ham Fighters, in 2004, which won the 2006 Japan Series, and the victory parade was held on Ekimae-Dōri (a street in front of Sapporo Station) in February 2007.

The 34th G8 summit took place in Tōyako in 2008, and a number of people including anti-globalization activists marched in the heart of the city to protest. Police officers were gathered in Sapporo from all over Japan, and the news reported that four people were arrested in the demonstrations.

The Hokkaidō Shinkansen line, which currently connects Honshu to Hakodate through the Seikan Tunnel, is planned to link to Sapporo by 2030.

Geography 

Sapporo is a city located in the southwest part of Ishikari Plain and the alluvial fan of the Toyohira River, a tributary stream of the Ishikari River. It is part of Ishikari Subprefecture. Roadways in the urban district are laid to make a grid plan. The western and southern parts of Sapporo are occupied by a number of mountains including Mount Teine, Maruyama, and Mount Moiwa, as well as many rivers including the Ishikari River, Toyohira River, and Sōsei River.

Sapporo has many parks, including Odori Park, which is located in the heart of the city and hosts a number of annual events and festivals throughout the year. Moerenuma Park is also one of the largest parks in Sapporo, and was constructed under the plan of Isamu Noguchi, a Japanese-American artist and landscape architect.

Neighbouring cities are Ishikari, Ebetsu, Kitahiroshima, Eniwa, Chitose, Otaru, Date, and adjoining towns are Tōbetsu, Kimobetsu, Kyōgoku.

Wards 

Sapporo currently has ten .

 Cityscape 

 Climate 

Sapporo has a humid continental climate (Köppen: Dfa), with a wide range of temperature between the summer and winter. Sapporo is one of few metropolises in the world with such heavy snowfall, enabling it to hold events and festivals with snow statues. The heavy snowfall is due to the Siberian High developing over the Eurasian land mass and the Aleutian Low developing over the northern Pacific Ocean, resulting in a flow of cold air southeastward across Tsushima Current and to western Hokkaido.

 Demographics 
The first census of the population of Sapporo was taken in 1873, when 753 families with a total of 1,785 people were recorded in the town. The city has an estimated population of 1,957,914 as of May 31, 2019 and a population density of 1,746 persons per km2 (4,500 persons per mi2).

 Economy 

The tertiary sector dominates Sapporo's industry. Major industries include information technology, retail, and tourism, as Sapporo is a destination for winter sports and events and summer activities due to its comparatively cool climate.

The city is also the manufacturing centre of Hokkaido, manufacturing various goods such as food and related products, fabricated metal products, steel, machinery, beverages, and pulp and paper. The Sapporo Breweries, founded in 1876, is a major company and employer in the city.

Hokkaido International Airlines (Air Do) is headquartered in Chūō-ku. In April 2004, Air Nippon Network was headquartered in Higashi-ku. Other companies headquartered in Sapporo include Crypton Future Media, DB-Soft, Hokkaido Air System, and Royce'.

Greater Sapporo, Sapporo Metropolitan Employment Area (2.3 million people), had a total GDP of US$84.7 billion in 2010.Conversion rates - Exchange rates - OECD Data

In 2014, Sapporo's GDP per capita (PPP) was US$32,446.

 Culture and entertainment 
 Music 
 1934 – The International Contemporary Music Festival was held by Akira Ifukube, Fumio Hayasaka, Atsushi Miura, and Isamu Ifukube (30 September)
 1936 – Russian composer Alexander Tcherepnin visited Sapporo
 1960 – The Sapporo Symphony Orchestra founded
 1962 – John Cage and David Tudor visited Sapporo
 1966 – Berliner Philharmoniker with Herbert von Karajan performed Brahms's Symphony No. 2 at Sapporo Shimin Kaikan (April)
 1974 – Maria Callas last public performance at the Hokkaido Koseinenkin Kaikan (11 November)
 1986 – The Sapporo Art Park include the Outdoor Stage and Art Hall (27 July)
 1990 – The Pacific Music Festival (PMF) started
 1997 – The Sapporo Concert Hall opened
 2018 – The Sapporo Community Plaza is set to open in October

 Art 
 The Hokkaido Museum of Modern Art represents Hokkaido artists like Eien Iwahashi, Kinjiro Kida, Nissho Kanda, Tamako Kataoka, and especially glass objects of Ecole de Paris
The Hongō Shin Memorial Museum of Sculpture hosts a collection of over 1,800 works by the artist Hongō Shin.
 The Sapporo Art Park contains Art museum featuring outdoor installations & a sculpture garden, and the old house of Takeo Arishima.
 The Moerenuma Park including the Glass Pyramid, designed by Isamu Noguchi
 The Migishi Kotaro Museum of Art
 The Hongo Shin Memorial Museum of Sculpture
 The Miyanomori Art Museum
 The Sapporo Odori 500-m Underground Walkway Gallery
 Member of UNESCO Creative Cities Network as a Creative City of Media Arts since 2013
 Sapporo International Art Festival (2014/2017)

 Literature 
 The Hokkaido Museum of Literature
 Takeo Arishima Residence in Sapporo Art Park
 Junichi Watanabe Museum of Literature

 Film 
 The Idiot (1951 film) by Akira Kurosawa
 The Northern Museum of Visual Culture
 Theater Kino
 The Sapporo International Short Film Festival and Market

 Video games 
 Yakuza 5 Persona 5 Strikers Pokémon Diamond and Pearl, Pokémon Platinum and Pokémon Legends: Arceus, Jubilife City, the capital of the Sinnoh region, is based on Sapporo.

 Points of interest 

 The former Hokkaidō government office building
 The Sapporo Clock Tower
 The Hokkaidō Shrine
 Nishino Shrine
 Hokkaido Museum
 Historical Village of Hokkaido
 Sapporo Buried Cultural Property Center
 The Sapporo City Archive Museum (Former Sapporo Court of Appeal)
 The Edwin Dun Memorial Hall
 The Hokkaido University & Hokkaido University Museum
 The Sapporo Beer Museum & Sapporo Factory
 The Sapporo TV Tower
 The Sapporo Convention Center
 The Sapporo Salmon Museum in Makomanai Park
 The Sunpiazza Aquarium

Sapporo JR Tower adjacent to Sapporo Station.

Sapporo Ramen Yokocho and Norubesa (a building with a Ferris wheel) are in Susukino district. The district also has the Tanuki Kōji Shopping Arcade, the oldest shopping mall in the city.

The district of Jōzankei in Minami-ku has many resort hotels with steam baths and onsen.

The Peace Pagoda, one of many such monuments across the world built by the Buddhist order Nipponzan Myohoji to promote and inspire world peace, has a stupa that was built in 1959, halfway up Mount Moiwa, to commemorate peace after World War II. It contains some of the ashes of the Buddha that were presented to the Emperor of Japan by Prime Minister Nehru in 1954. Another portion was presented to Mikhail Gorbachev by the Nipponzan-Myohoji monk, Junsei Terasawa.

 Parks/gardens 

 The Odori Park 
 The Nakajima Park
 The Maruyama Park is located next to the Hokkaido Shrine and houses the Maruyama Zoo.
 The Moerenuma Park 
 The Nishioka Park is a location of rich nature which centers around a pond and consists of marshland and the forest of the Tsukisamu River and its upper river basin. This park also serves as one of the main habitats in Hokkaido for many types of wild birds.
 The Asahiyama Memorial Park offers great views of the city.
 The Hokkaido University Botanical Gardens and The Chizaki Rose Garden
 The Hitsujigaoka Observation Hill has a farm with sheep and attracts visitors with a statue of William S. Clark.

 Events/festivals 

February: the Sapporo Snow Festival The main site is at Odori Park, and other sites include Susukino (known as the Susukino Ice Festival) and Sapporo Satoland. Many of the snow and ice statues are built by members of the Japan Ground Self-Defense Force.

May: the Sapporo Lilac Festival. Lilac was brought to Sapporo in 1889 by an American educator, Sarah Clara Smith. At the festival, people enjoy the flowers, wine and live music.

June: the Yosakoi Soran Festival. The sites of the festival are centered on Odori Park and the street leading to Susukino, and there are other festival sites. In the festival, many dance teams dance to music composed based on a Japanese traditional song, "Sōran Bushi". Members of the dancing teams wear special costumes and compete on the roads or stages constructed on the festival sites. In 2006, 350 teams were featured with around 45,000 dancers, and over 1,860,000 people visited the festival.

The Sapporo Summer Festival. People enjoy drinking at the beer garden in Odori Park and on the streets of Susukino. This festival consists of a number of fairs such as Tanuki Festival and Susukino Festival.

September: the Sapporo Autumn Festival

December: Christmas market in Odori Park, similar to German Christmas markets.

From November through January, many citizens enjoy the Sapporo White Illuminations.

 Cuisine 

The city is home to Sapporo Brewery, white chocolate biscuits known as 'shiroi koibito' (白い恋人), and also as the birthplace of miso ramen. Kouraku Ramen Meitengai, in the Susukino district, is an alley lined with many miso ramen restaurants, since 1951. After its demolition, due to plans for the Sapporo Olympics, the Ganso Sapporo Ramen Yokocho was established in its place. It attracts many tourists throughout the year. From the year 1966, a food company named, Sanyo Foods, began to sell instant ramen under the brand name, "Sapporo Ichiban".

Haskap, a local variety of edible honeysuckle, similar to blueberries, is a specialty in Sapporo. Other specialty dishes of Sapporo include; soup curry, a soupy curry made with vegetables and chicken, sometimes other meats too, and jingisukan, a barbecued lamb dish, named after Genghis Khan. Sapporo Sweets, is a confectionery using many ingredients from Hokkaido where there's also the Sapporo Sweets Competition held annually. Sapporo is also well known for fresh seafood including; salmon, sea urchin and crab. Crab in particular is famed. Many types of crab are harvested and served seasonally in Sapporo like the Horsehair crab, Snow crab, King crab, and Hanasaki crab with numerous dishes revolving around them.

 Sports 

The Sapporo Dome was constructed in 2001 and is currently host to the local professional teams, Hokkaido Consadole Sapporo (football), and Hokkaido Nippon-Ham Fighters (baseball).

ES CON Field Hokkaido (エスコンフィールド北海道, Esukon Fīrudo Hokkaidō), a baseball park under construction in Kitahiroshima, Hokkaido, will become the future home to Nippon Professional Baseball's Hokkaido Nippon-Ham Fighters and is scheduled to open in March, 2023.

Sapporo was selected as host to the 5th Winter Olympics, scheduled for February 3 to 12, 1940; however Japan had to cancel the event, consequently handing the decision back to the IOC, after the Second Sino-Japanese War broke out in 1937.

In 1972, Sapporo hosted the 11th Winter Olympics. Some structures built for Olympic events remain in use today, including the ski jumps at Miyanomori and Okurayama. After considering a bid for the 2026 Winter Olympics, Olympic representatives in Sapporo have said that the city is considering a bid for the 2030 Winter Olympics. The city predicts it may cost as much as 456.5 billion yen ($4.3 billion) to host the games and is planning to have 90 percent of the facilities within half an hour of the Olympic village, according to a report published 12 May 2016. The Alpen course would be in Niseko, the world's second-snowiest resort, while the village would be next to the Sapporo Dome, the report said. The plans were presented to the Japanese Olympic Committee on 8 November 2016. In 2002, Sapporo hosted three group matches of the FIFA World Cup at the Sapporo Dome. In 2006, Sapporo hosted some games of the 2006 Basketball World Championship and also for the 2006 Women's Volleyball World Championship. In 2007, Sapporo hosted the FIS Nordic World Ski Championships at the Sapporo Dome, Miyanomori ski jump, Okurayama ski jump, and the Shirahatayama cross-country course. It has been the host city to two Asian Winter Games and hosted the 2017 Asian Winter Games in Obihiro. Sapporo also hosted games during the 2019 Rugby World Cup.

Skiing remains a major sport in Sapporo with almost all children skiing as a part of the school curriculum. Okurayama Elementary School is unusual in having its own ski hill and ski jumping hill on the school grounds. Within the city are commercial ski hills including Moiwayama, Bankeiyama, KobaWorld, Sapporo Teine and Fu's.

Many sports stadiums and domes are located in Sapporo, and some of them have been designated as venues of sports competitions. The Sapporo Community Dome, also known by its nickname "Tsu-Dome", has hosted the Golden Market, a huge flea market event which is usually held twice a year, along with some sports events. The Makomanai Ice Arena, in Makomanai Park, was one of the venues of the Sapporo Olympics in 1972. It was renamed the Makomanai Sekisuiheim Ice Arena in 2007, when Sekisui Chemical Co., Ltd., acquired naming rights and renamed the arena after their real estate brand. Other large sports venues include the Makomanai Open Stadium, Tsukisamu Dome, Maruyama Baseball Stadium, and the Hokkaido Prefectural Sports Center, which hosts the professional basketball team, Levanga Hokkaido.

Toyota Big Air is a major international snowboarding event held annually in Sapporo Dome. As one of the richest events of its kind in the world, it draws many of the world's best snowboarders.

 Professional sport teams 

 J.League – Hokkaido Consadole Sapporo (J1 in 1998, 2001–2002, 2008, 2012, 2017–present; J2 in 1999–2000, 2003–2007, 2009–2011, 2013–2016).
 NPB – Hokkaido Nippon Ham Fighters in Pacific League

 Transportation 
Sapporo has one streetcar line, three JR Hokkaido lines, three subway lines and JR Bus, Chuo Bus and other bus lines. Sapporo Subway trains have rubber-tired wheels.

 Rapid transit 

Sapporo Municipal Subway
Sapporo Streetcar
Mount Moiwa Ropeway
Teineyama Ropeway

 Rail 

JR Hokkaido Stations in Sapporo
Hakodate Line: (Zenibako) – Hoshimi – Hoshioki – Inaho – Teine – Inazumi Kōen – Hassamu – Hassamu Chūō – Kotoni – Sōen – Sapporo – Naebo – Shiroishi – Atsubetsu – Shinrinkōen – (Ōasa)
Chitose Line: Heiwa – Shin Sapporo – Kami Nopporo – (Kita-Hiroshima)
Sasshō Line (Gakuentoshi Line): Sōen – Hachiken – Shinkawa – Shinkotoni – Taihei – Yurigahara – Shinoro – Takuhoku – Ainosato Kyōikudai – Ainosato Kōen – (Ishikari Futomi)

 Air 
The Sapporo-Tokyo route between New Chitose and Haneda is one of the busiest in the world.

 Airport shuttle, tour and charter bus service 
An airport shuttle bus servicing all hotels in Sapporo operates every day of the year. SkyExpress was founded in 2005 and also provides transport to and from various ski resorts throughout Hokkaido, including Niseko.

 Education 
 Universities 

 National 
Hokkaido University
Hokkaido University of EducationSee Japanese national university''

Public 
Sapporo Medical University
Sapporo City University

Private 
Sapporo University
Hokusei Gakuen University
Hokkai School of Commerce
Hokkai Gakuen University
Fuji Women's University
Sapporo International University
Tenshi College
Health Sciences University of Hokkaido
Sapporo Ōtani University
Hokkaido Tokai University
Hokkaido Musashi Women's Junior College
Hokkaido Bunkyo University
Hokkaido University of Science
Koen Gakuen Women's Junior College
Hokkaido Institute of Technology
Hokkaido College of Pharmacy
Sapporo University of Health Sciences
Japan Health Care College

Primary and secondary schools

Sapporo Odori High School provides Japanese-language classes to foreign and Japanese returnee students, and the school has special admissions quotas for these groups.

The city has two private international schools:
 Hokkaido International School
 Hokkaido Korean Primary, Middle and High School (North Korean school)

Twin towns – sister cities

Sapporo has twinning relationships with several cities worldwide.

 Daejeon, South Korea (since October 2010)
 Denver, CO, United States (since September 1982)
 Munich, Bavaria, Germany (since August 1972)
 Novosibirsk, Novosibirsk Oblast, Russia (since June 1990)
 Portland, OR, United States (since November 1959)
 Shenyang, Liaoning, China (since November 1980)

See also 
Sapporo Brewery

Notes

References

External links 

 Official Website 
 Sapporo Travel
 Unesco Media City Sapporo

 
Cities in Hokkaido
Populated places established in 1868
1868 establishments in Japan
Cities designated by government ordinance of Japan